Alma Toliver Allen (born April 7, 1939) is a Democratic member of the Texas House of Representatives for District 131 in Harris County, Texas. She became a representative in 2004 after serving on the Texas State Board of Education for ten years.

Allen won her eighth term in the legislature in the general election held on November 6, 2018. With 35,878 votes (85.8 percent), she overwhelmed the Republican candidate, Syed S. Ali, who polled 5,926 votes (14.2 percent). Allen took office on January 11, 2005.

She originates from the Sunnyside neighborhood of Houston.

References

1939 births
Living people
Democratic Party members of the Texas House of Representatives
21st-century American politicians
Women state legislators in Texas
University of Houston alumni
Texas Southern University alumni
21st-century American women politicians